George Lincoln Eyrich (March 3, 1925 – June 25, 2006) was a Major League Baseball pitcher who played for the Philadelphia Phillies in 1943.

Eyrich is one of many ballplayers who only appeared in the major leagues during World War II. He made his major league debut on June 13, 1943, in a road doubleheader against the New York Giants at the Polo Grounds.

Eyrich appeared in a total of nine games, all in relief, with six games finished in 1943 for the Philadelphia Phillies. Even though he allowed 36 baserunners (27 hits and 9 walks) in just 18 innings pitched, he gave up only seven earned runs. His short career ended with a 0–0 record and a 3.38 ERA.

Eyrich was born and died in Reading, Pennsylvania.

References

External links

1925 births
2006 deaths
Major League Baseball pitchers
Baseball players from Pennsylvania
Sportspeople from Reading, Pennsylvania
Philadelphia Phillies players